The 2002 Bowling Green Falcons football team represented Bowling Green State University in the 2002 NCAA Division I-A football season. The team was coached by Urban Meyer and played their home games in Doyt Perry Stadium in Bowling Green, Ohio. It was the 84th season of play for the Falcons. Despite finishing 9-3, the Falcons were not invited to a bowl game.

Schedule

References

Bowling Green
Bowling Green Falcons football seasons
Bowling Green Falcons football